Hester is an unincorporated community in northern Marion County, in the U.S. state of Missouri.

The community is on a ridge just west of the South Fabius River between Troublesome Creek to the south and Grassy Creek to the north. Adjacent communities are Maywood three miles to the north-northeast in Lewis County and Naomi, approximately four miles to the west.

The community had a post office from 1848 to 1904, which was in the home owned by Daniel Boone's daughter, Mrs. Elizabeth Coons. However, the origin of the name is uncertain.

References

Unincorporated communities in Marion County, Missouri
Unincorporated communities in Missouri